is a retired Japanese long-distance runner. Her first and only international medal came at the 1997 Summer Universiade where she took the bronze in the 10,000 metres. She won the Kobe Women's Half Marathon in 2001, setting a personal best time of 1:08:54 for the event.

Her greatest achievements came in 2002 when she won the Fukuoka International Cross Country and went on to finish in fourth in the long race at the 2002 IAAF World Cross Country Championships. She also won the Chiba International Cross Country competition in 2005.

Achievements

Personal bests
5000 metres - 15:20.58 min (2002) 
10,000 metres - 31:32.10 min (2003)
Half marathon - 1:08:54 hrs (2001)

References

1978 births
Living people
Japanese female long-distance runners
Universiade medalists in athletics (track and field)
Universiade bronze medalists for Japan
Medalists at the 1997 Summer Universiade
20th-century Japanese women
21st-century Japanese women